Scent trail may refer to
 trail pheromones laid down to guide navigation by ants etc.
 a scent trail used in tracking (hunting) or by a tracking dog